Ardo Kola is a Local Government Area in Taraba State, Nigeria. Its headquarters are in the town of Sunkani.

It has an area of 2,262 km and a population of 86,921 at the 2006 census.

The postal code of the area is 660.

References

Local Government Areas in Taraba State